Zummo is a surname. Notable people with the surname include:

Bethany Zummo (born 1993), American sitting volleyball player
Frank Zummo (born 1978), American musician
Peter Zummo (born 1948), American composer and trombonist
Vinnie Zummo (born 1973), American musician, producer, writer, arranger, and sound designer